Thomas Bury may refer to:

 Thomas Bury (cricketer) (1831–1918), English cricketer
 Thomas Bury (judge) (1655–1722), English judge and Chief Baron of the Exchequer
 Thomas Talbot Bury (1809–1877), British architect and lithographer

See also
Thomas Berry (disambiguation)